Dunstan Bukenya was an Anglican bishop who served in Uganda: from 2002 to 2008 he was the third Bishop of Mityana

References

21st-century Anglican bishops in Uganda
Anglican bishops of Mityana